Itapúa is a department in the southern region of Paraguay. The capital is the city of Encarnación. It is divided into 30 districts, more than any other district in the country.

History
This department was created after the breakup of the Misiones Department, with the city of Encarnación as the capital. It had high economic growth in the first 30 years of the arrival of immigrants and the Carlos Antonio Lopez Railway; the growth was accompanied by several ups and downs.

An era of decline followed until the 1950s when the Carnaval Encarnaceno became better known and attracted tourists from various regions. In the 1980s the department became more industrial, but modestly so compared with other departments like the Central Department.

In 1989 the Yacyretá Dam displaced the people living in the Yacyretá Reservoir; the displacement still continues. The San Roque González de Santa Cruz Bridge was inaugurated in 1991, connecting not only the city of Encarnación and Posadas, but also Paraguay with Argentina.

Toponymy 
The name is in Guaraní and refers to the place where Encarnación, the current capital city, was founded. The site was known as "itá" (rock, stone) and "punta" (tip); hence the name means "Tip of the Stone".

Demography

According to the 2002 National Census Itapúa has a total population of 453,692 inhabitants making it the third-most populated department of the country after Central and Alto Paraná. 8.9% of Paraguay's total population lives in this department.

Cultural diversity

Much of the Itapúa region was colonized by immigrants from different origins, among them the Italians, Germans, Russians, Ukrainians, French, Japanese, Poles, and also immigrants from Syria and Lebanon in more recent times. Because of this cultural diversity Itapúa was given the name "Melting pot", making it the most cosmopolitan department of Paraguay.

In the beginning, the first major economic activity of the immigrants was the exploitation of natural resources, especially timber, in the Alto Paraná and San Rafael Hills (now a national park). Nowadays, residents are engaged in several thriving industries, including agriculture (soybean, tung, corn, etc.) and livestock.

Administrative division 
The department is divided into the following 30 districts:

Location
This department is located southeast of the Eastern Region of Paraguay.

Limits
 North: the departments of Alto Paraná and Caazapá.
 South: with Argentina (Provinces of Misiones and Corrientes). Separated by the Paraná River.
 East: the Argentine Republic (Misiones Province).
 West: with the Misiones Department.

Climate
The climate is humid subtropical with a tendency to low temperatures, the annual average is 15 °C, with a maximum of 40 °C and a minimum of -3 °C. Rainfall is abundant, with an annual average of nearly 1,700 mm, recorded throughout most of the year except in July and August.

See also

 List of high schools in Itapúa

References

 
Guaraní words and phrases